Celebrating Life is the 2008 debut album by Icelandic musician Borko. It was released in March, 2008 on record labels Morr Music and Kimi Records. Participating on the album are also members from fellow Icelandic bands múm and Benni Hemm Hemm.

Track listing 
 "Continental Love" – 5:39
 "Spoonstabber" – 4:03
 "Shoo Ba Ba" – 4:27
 "Sushi Stakeout" – 5:02
 "Dingdong Kingdom" – 4:41
 "Summer Logic" – 5:19
 "Doo Doo Doo" – 5:37
 "Hondo & Borko" – 6:33

Personnel 
 Björn Kristjánsson – vocals, synthesizer, electronic organ, electronic keyboard, rhodes piano. piano, vibraphone, glockenspiel
 Helgi Svavar Helgason – drums
 Guðmundur Óskar Guðmundsson – bass guitar
 Róbert Sturla Reynisson – acoustic/electric baritone guitar. soprano guitar
 Örvar Þóreyjarson Smárason – electric guitar, harmonica
 Áki Asgeirsson – trumpet
 Eirikur Orri Olafsson – trumpet
 Númi Þorkell Thomasson – additional drums
 Davið Þór Jónsson – bass vocals on "Summer Logic"
 Friðrik Sólnes Jónsson – vocals on "Doo Doo Doo"

References

External links 
 Release leaflet from Morr Music
 Release press desk from Morr Music
 Morr Music
 Kimi Records

Borko albums
2008 debut albums